Patrick McLane (March 14, 1875 – November 13, 1946) was a Democratic member of the U.S. House of Representatives from Pennsylvania.

Biography
Patrick McLane was born in County Mayo, Ireland. He immigrated to the United States in 1882 with his parents, who settled in Scranton, Pennsylvania. He worked in the coal mines of Scranton for thirteen years. During the Spanish–American War he served in the Eleventh Regiment of the United States Army, in 1898 and 1899. He became a locomotive engineer. He was a member of the Scranton School Board from 1904 to 1911. He served as a delegate to the Democratic State convention in 1905, and as a member of the Democratic State committee in 1914.

McLane presented credentials as a Democratic Member-elect to the Sixty-sixth Congress. He was provisionally seated, but the election was contested. The House investigation found that, in his campaign, McClane had violated the Federal Corrupt Practices Act and that furthermore "there was widespread fraud and illegality in the election itself." Once the fraudulent returns were removed, McLane was found to have lost to John Richard Farr. McLane served from March 4, 1919 to February 25, 1921, when he was succeeded by Farr. He was an unsuccessful candidate for election in 1922 and in 1924.

He was employed as a locomotive engineer until his death, aged 71, in Scranton in 1946. He was interred in Cathedral Cemetery.

References

 Retrieved on 2008-02-11
The Political Graveyard

1875 births
1946 deaths
Irish emigrants to the United States (before 1923)
Politicians from Scranton, Pennsylvania
Politicians from County Mayo
American military personnel of the Spanish–American War
Democratic Party members of the United States House of Representatives from Pennsylvania
Members of the United States House of Representatives removed by contest